Westport High School is located in Westport, Massachusetts, United States. It services students in grades 5–12. It is part of the Westport Community Schools. It is listed by the district as a middle/high school. The principals are Laura Charette (middle) and Kerri McKinnon (high).

Notable alumni
 Black Francis frontman of the Pixies
 Allen Levrault,  Former MLB player (Milwaukee Brewers, Florida Marlins)

Sports
Westport High School (WHS) has multiple sports teams that have won many sports championships in the Mayflower League. Westport offers boys soccer, girls soccer, girls field hockey, girls volleyball, golf (co-ed), boys basketball, girls basketball, cheerleading, boys baseball, girls softball, boys tennis, and girls tennis. Students from Westport who want to play football, track, and lacrosse go to Bishop Connolly High School and play for the Cougars as a part of a co-op program between the two schools.

Education
Westport High School offers English, Algebra (I & II), Geometry, World History, US History (I & II), and Biology as the required four subject areas. WHS offers two world languages, Portuguese and Spanish. Westport also offers Physical Education/Health, Tech Fluency, Web Design, Sculpture & Ceramics, Introduction to Art, Photography, Cinematography, Drawing & Painting, Multimedia, Digital Media, Concert Band, History of Rock and Roll, Guitar, Jazz Rock, Percussion Ensemble, Concert Chorus, Fitness, and Journalism (associated with The Villager).

Over the years, Westport has added a multitude of honors, and advanced placement classes to prepare students for advanced education beyond high school. Pre-calculus, calculus, and physics are just a few of the advanced placement classes that are available.

Junior/Senior High School
Westport High School and Westport Middle School officially merged on September 8, 2015, creating a junior/senior high school in Westport. Due to building issues at the old Westport Middle School (mostly asbestos infestation), the school committee voted in favor to close down the middle school at the end of the 2014–15 school year—temporarily moving the 7th and 8th grades to Westport High School, thus creating a junior/ senior high school. The Town of Westport along with the Westport Community Schools system are currently exploring options to receive funding from the Massachusetts School Building Authority for a new school building in the future.

References

External links
 

Schools in Bristol County, Massachusetts
Public high schools in Massachusetts